Enrico Zaina (born 27 September 1967 in Brescia) is an Italian former road bicycle racer. Zaina turned professional in 1989. He won a stage of 1995 Giro d'Italia and two stages of 1996 Giro d'Italia, where he finished second behind Pavel Tonkov. He also won a stage of 1992 Vuelta a España.

Major achievements

1992
1st, Stage 17, Vuelta a España
1993
1st, Overall, Settimana Bergamasca
1995
1st, Stage 11, Giro d'Italia
1996
2nd, Overall, Giro d'Italia
1st, Stage 9 & 20
1999
1st, Stage 3, Settimana Ciclistica Lombarda

External links 

Italian male cyclists
Living people
1967 births
Italian Giro d'Italia stage winners
Italian Vuelta a España stage winners
Cyclists from Brescia